The Madison Range is a mountain range located in the Rocky Mountains of Montana and Idaho in the United States. The range was named in honor of future President of the United States, then U.S. Secretary of State James Madison by Meriwether Lewis as the Lewis and Clark Expedition travelled through Montana in 1805. The range extends  from West Yellowstone, Montana to Bozeman, Montana and is flanked by the Madison River on the west and the Gallatin River to the east.

The Madison Range is the westernmost section of what is collectively referred to as the Greater Yellowstone Ecosystem. Most of the range lies within Beaverhead-Deerlodge and Gallatin National Forests. A small portion of the range has been further protected with the creation of the Lee Metcalf Wilderness. The region has grizzly and black bears and at least one pack of wolves. Most other larger mammal species native to the region continue to exist in the range.

Quake Lake lies not far to the south of Hilgard Peak. The lake was created by a landslide which dammed the Madison River at the time of the M7.5 1959 Hebgen Lake earthquake.

See also
 List of mountain ranges in Montana

Notes

Mountain ranges of Montana
Greater Yellowstone Ecosystem
Landforms of Madison County, Montana
Gallatin National Forest
Beaverhead-Deerlodge National Forest
Mountain ranges of Idaho